Añatuya is a city in the province of Santiago del Estero, Argentina. It lies on the southeast of the province, east of the Salado River, and about 150 km from the provincial capital Santiago del Estero.
La 
Añatuya is the seat of the Catholic Diocese of Añatuya, and it was the birthplace of the renowned tango composer Homero Manzi and basketball player Gabriel Deck.

Notable people
 María Elisa Castro (born 1954), politician

References

 
 Municipalities of the Taboada Department. Santiago del Estero Province, official website.

Populated places in Santiago del Estero Province
Cities in Argentina
Argentina
Santiago del Estero Province